The Central Interceptor is a sewerage infrastructure project in Auckland, New Zealand. The project is being undertaken by Watercare Services and involves boring a  diameter wastewater pipe underneath the Auckland central isthmus, to carry wastewater flows from parts of the city to the Mangere Wastewater Treatment Plant.

The project allows for population growth in Auckland and the resulting increased wastewater demands, and also aims to reduce the amount of wastewater overflows from the older combined wastewater/stormwater systems in western Auckland, which currently, on strong rainfall days, are forced to dump excess water (contaminated by faeces) into the Waitematā Harbour. One typical example was on 27 January 2023, when a water quality alert was issued for 11 Auckland beachs because of wastewater overflows in heavy rain. The new capacity of the central interceptor is expected to reduce these overflows by at least 80%, reducing the times per year that contaminated stormwater is dumped into the harbour from 52 days a year to 10 or fewer days.

The new interceptor will be Auckland's largest wastewater project in history, costing approximately $1.2B, and is 13 km long (plus side branches). It is to run from Western Springs to Mangere.

Construction
The construction contract was signed in March 2019 with the Ghella Abergeldie Joint Venture. Construction is expected to be from 2019 to 2024.

Construction will be via tunnel boring machine, and the course will take the tunnel  underneath the Manukau Harbour, though (due to the height of the central isthmus).

In May 2021, Watercare reported that the project was 8 months into what was expected to be a 5 year construction period. Local school children have gifted a name for the tunnel boring machine: Hiwa-i-te-rangi.

References

Sewerage infrastructure in New Zealand
Auckland
Proposed infrastructure in New Zealand